Khuzaʽa may refer to:

Khuzaʽa, Khan Yunis, a Palestinian town in the southern Gaza Strip
Banū Khuzaʽah, an Arabian tribe